The 2017–18 Meralco Bolts season was the eighth season of the franchise in the Philippine Basketball Association (PBA).

Key dates

2017
October 29: The 2017 PBA draft took place in Midtown Atrium, Robinson Place Manila.

Draft picks

Roster

Philippine Cup

Eliminations

Standings

Game log

|- style="background:#bfb;"
| 1
| December 22
| Blackwater
| W 103–98
| KG Canaleta (25)
| Jason Ballesteros (12)
| Baser Amer (12)
| Cuneta Astrodome
| 1–0
|- style="background:#fcc;"
| 2
| December 27
| San Miguel
| L 97–103
| Mike Tolomia (21)
| Chris Newsome (13)
| Baser Amer (9)
| Ynares Center
| 1–1

|- style="background:#fcc;"
| 3
| January 10
| Alaska
| L 98–103
| Chris Newsome (23)
| KG Canaleta (10)
| Amer, Newsome (4)
| Smart Araneta Coliseum
| 1–2
|- style="background:#fcc;"
| 4
| January 21
| TNT
| L 81–99
| Baser Amer (20)
| Amer, Ballesteros (6)
| Baser Amer (6)
| Ynares Center
| 1–3
|- style="background:#bfb;"
| 5
| January 24
| Kia
| W 105–76
| KG Canaleta (17)
| Chris Newsome (7)
| Baser Amer (9)
| Smart Araneta Coliseum
| 2–3
|- style="background:#fcc;"
| 6
| January 28
| GlobalPort
| L 88–107
| Hugnatan, Newsome (17)
| Cliff Hodge (8)
| three players (3)
| Smart Araneta Coliseum
| 2–4

|- style="background:#fcc;"
| 7
| February 2
| Rain or Shine
| L 84–90
| KG Canaleta (24)
| Chris Newsome (11)
| Chris Newsome (7)
| Mall of Asia Arena
| 2–5
|- style="background:#fcc;"
| 8
| February 9
| NLEX
| L 85–87
| Nico Salva (20)
| Chris Newsome (10)
| Chris Newsome (7)
| Cuneta Astrodome
| 2–6
|- style="background:#bfb;"
| 9
| February 14
| Phoenix
| W 92–90
| Garvo Lanete (24)
| Jason Ballesteros (12)
| Chris Newsome (5)
| Smart Araneta Coliseum
| 3–6
|- style="background:#bfb;"
| 10
| February 18
| Barangay Ginebra
| W 84–82
| Garvo Lanete (19)
| Jason Ballesteros (17)
| Chris Newsome (6)
| Philippine Arena
| 4–6
|- style="background:#fcc;"
| 11
| February 24
| Magnolia
| L 65–94
| Chris Newsome (13)
| Jason Ballesteros (9)
| Chris Newsome (3)
| Xavier University Gym
| 4–7

Commissioner's Cup

Eliminations

Standings

Game log

|- style="background:#bfb;"
| 1
| April 25
| Columbian
| W 116–103
| Arinze Onuaku (30)
| Arinze Onuaku (19)
| Chris Newsome (7)
| Smart Araneta Coliseum
| 1–0
|- style="background:#fcc;"
| 2
| April 27
| GlobalPort
| L 85–86
| KG Canaleta (28)
| Arinze Onuaku (14)
| Baser Amer (8)
| Smart Araneta Coliseum
| 1–1

|- style="background:#bfb;"
| 3
| May 4
| NLEX
| W 106–90
| Chris Newsome (30)
| Arinze Onuaku (23)
| Baser Amer (6)
| Smart Araneta Coliseum
| 2–1
|- style="background:#bfb;"
| 4
| May 9
| San Miguel
| W 93–85
| Baser Amer (28)
| Arinze Onuaku (12)
| Arinze Onuaku (8)
| Mall of Asia Arena
| 3–1
|- style="background:#fcc;"
| 5
| May 18
| Magnolia
| L 79–81
| Arinze Onuaku (23)
| Arinze Onuaku (11)
| Newsome, Onuaku (7)
| Smart Araneta Coliseum
| 3–2
|- align="center"
|colspan="9" bgcolor="#bbcaff"|All-Star Break

|- style="background:#bfb;"
| 6
| June 1
| Barangay Ginebra
| W 93–82
| Arinze Onuaku (24)
| Arinze Onuaku (23)
| Anjo Caram (7)
| Mall of Asia Arena
| 4–2
|- style="background:#bfb;"
| 7
| June 8
| Phoenix
| W 103–100 (OT)
| KG Canaleta (30)
| Arinze Onuaku (20)
| Arinze Onuaku (10)
| Smart Araneta Coliseum
| 5–2
|- style="background:#bfb;"
| 8
| June 15
| Blackwater
| W 102–75
| Arinze Onuaku (17)
| Arinze Onuaku (16)
| Chris Newsome (6)
| Mall of Asia Arena
| 6–2
|- style="background:#bfb;"
| 9
| June 17
| Alaska
| W 89–74
| Chris Newsome (18)
| Arinze Onuaku (23)
| Chris Newsome (8)
| Smart Araneta Coliseum
| 7–2
|- style="background:#fcc;"
| 10
| June 22
| TNT
| L 85–91
| Chris Newsome (17)
| Arinze Onuaku (11)
| Hodge, Onuaku (4)
| Smart Araneta Coliseum
| 7–3
|- style="background:#fcc;"
| 11
| June 24
| Rain or Shine
| L 99–106 (OT)
| Chris Newsome (21)
| Arinze Onuaku (11)
| Chris Newsome (11)
| Smart Araneta Coliseum
| 7–4

Playoffs

Bracket

Game log

|- style="background:#fcc;"
| 1
| July 9
| Barangay Ginebra
| L 81–88
| Baser Amer (15)
| Arinze Onuaku (18)
| Chris Newsome (7)
| Smart Araneta Coliseum
| 0–1
|- style="background:#fcc;"
| 2
| July 11
| Barangay Ginebra
| L 90–104
| Arinze Onuaku (21)
| Arinze Onuaku (13)
| Amer, Newsome (4)
| Smart Araneta Coliseum
| 0–2

Governors' Cup

Eliminations

Standings

Game log

|- style="background:#bfb;"
| 1
| August 17
| Columbian
| W 109–106
| Allen Durham (26)
| Allen Durham (20)
| Allen Durham (9)
| Ynares Center
| 1–0
|- style="background:#fcc;"
| 2
| August 19
| TNT
| L 90–92
| Allen Durham (27)
| Allen Durham (22)
| Allen Durham (8)
| Ynares Center
| 1–1
|- style="background:#fcc;"
| 3
| August 24
| Alaska
| L 72–80
| Allen Durham (21)
| Allen Durham (11)
| Baser Amer (5)
| Mall of Asia Arena
| 1–2

|- style="background:#fcc;"
| 4
| September 19
| Phoenix
| L 86–96
| Chris Newsome (18)
| Allen Durham (13)
| Allen Durham (9)
| Smart Araneta Coliseum
| 1–3

|- style="background:#fcc;"
| 5
| October 5
| Blackwater
| L 91–94
| Allen Durham (32)
| Allen Durham (21)
| Allen Durham (6)
| Smart Araneta Coliseum
| 1–4
|- style="background:#fcc;"
| 6
| October 7
| Barangay Ginebra
| L 105–111
| Allen Durham (36)
| Allen Durham (16)
| Allen Durham (9)
| Sta. Rosa Multi-Purpose Complex
| 1–5
|- style="background:#fcc;"
| 7
| October 12
| NorthPort
| L 94–99
| Allen Durham (37)
| Allen Durham (19)
| Allen Durham (7)
| Mall of Asia Arena
| 1–6
|- style="background:#bfb;"
| 8
| October 14
| NLEX
| W 108–105
| Allen Durham (36)
| Allen Durham (18)
| Chris Newsome (9)
| Smart Araneta Coliseum
| 2–6
|- style="background:#bfb;"
| 9
| October 19
| Magnolia
| W 94–88
| Allen Durham (20)
| Allen Durham (18)
| Durham, Newsome (8)
| Ynares Center
| 3–6
|- style="background:#bfb;"
| 10
| October 21
| Rain or Shine
| W 91–82
| Allen Durham (19)
| Allen Durham (20)
| three players (6)
| Smart Araneta Coliseum
| 4–6

|- style="background:#bfb;"
| 11
| November 3
| San Miguel
| W 111–81
| Allen Durham (35)
| Allen Durham (26)
| Chris Newsome (12)
| Smart Araneta Coliseum
| 5–6

Playoffs

Bracket

Game log

|- style="background:#bfb;"
| 1
| November 7
| Phoenix
| W 90–74
| Allen Durham (26)
| Allen Durham (16)
| Baser Amer (6)
| Cuneta Astrodome
| 1–0
|- style="background:#bfb;"
| 2
| November 9
| Phoenix
| W 108–103 (OT)
| Allen Durham (32)
| Allen Durham (21)
| Allen Durham (9)
| Smart Araneta Coliseum
| 2–0

|- style="background:#bfb;"
| 1
| November 11
| Alaska
| W 97–92
| Allen Durham (32)
| Allen Durham (14)
| Allen Durham (6)
| Ynares Center
| 1–0
|- style="background:#fcc;"
| 2
| November 13
| Alaska
| L 95–100
| Allen Durham (24)
| Allen Durham (9)
| Allen Durham (12)
| Mall of Asia Arena
| 1–1
|- style="background:#fcc;"
| 3
| November 15
| Alaska
| L 102–104
| Allen Durham (37)
| Allen Durham (13)
| Allen Durham (8)
| Cuneta Astrodome
| 1–2
|- style="background:#fcc;"
| 4
| November 17
| Alaska
| L 92–99
| Allen Durham (31)
| Allen Durham (14)
| Chris Newsome (7)
| Cuneta Astrodome
| 1–3

FIBA Asia Champions Cup
The Bolts were chosen as the Philippine representative to the 2018 FIBA Asia Champions Cup.

Preliminary round

Group B

Final round

Transactions

Trades

Pre season

Free Agency

Addition

Recruited imports

Awards

References

Meralco Bolts seasons
Meralco